The 2006 Nextel All-Star Challenge was the second exhibition stock car race of the 2006 NASCAR Nextel Cup Series and the 22nd iteration of the event. The race was held on Saturday, May 20, 2006, in Concord, North Carolina at Lowe's Motor Speedway, a 1.5 miles (2.4 km) permanent quad-oval. The race took the scheduled 90 laps to complete. At race's end, Jimmie Johnson, driving for Hendrick Motorsports, would dominate the late stages of the race to win $1 million and his second Nextel All-Star Challenge. To fill out the podium, Kevin Harvick, driving for Richard Childress Racing, and Jeff Gordon, driving for Hendrick Motorsports, would finish second and third, respectively.

In the preliminary Nextel Open, MBV Motorsports driver Scott Riggs would dominate the race to move on to the main Nextel All-Star Challenge. Meanwhile, Petty Enterprises driver Kyle Petty would win the fan vote to move onto the Nextel All-Star Challenge.

Background 

Lowe's Motor Speedway is a motorsports complex located in Concord, North Carolina, United States 13 miles from Charlotte, North Carolina. The complex features a 1.5 miles (2.4 km) quad oval track that hosts NASCAR racing including the prestigious Coca-Cola 600 on Memorial Day weekend and the NEXTEL All-Star Challenge, as well as the UAW-GM Quality 500. The speedway was built in 1959 by Bruton Smith and is considered the home track for NASCAR with many race teams located in the Charlotte area. The track is owned and operated by Speedway Motorsports Inc. (SMI) with Marcus G. Smith (son of Bruton Smith) as track president.

Format and eligibility 
The 90 laps of the Nextel All-Star Challenge was divided into three segments. Caution laps between segment breaks were not counted. The first segment was 40 laps long. Mandatory 10-minute pit stops/breaks were implemented in between both segment breaks. During the first 10-minute break, a random ping pong ball (each ball would have one NASCAR on Fox announcer or pit reporter on it) picked by Chris Myers would lead Myers to open a giant, promotional Nextel flip phone of the corresponding announcer. Each phone had a number that would decide how many cars would be inverted to start Segment 2, a 30-lap segment. After the second 10-minute break, drivers would race in a 20-lap shootout to decide the winner of the Nextel All-Star Challenge.

Drivers who had won in the previous season and the first 11 eleven races of the current season were automatically eligible to qualify for the Nextel All-Star Challenge. In addition, previous champions and former Nextel All-Star Challenge winners within the last 10 years (1995-2004) were also automatically eligible.

Teams who were not automatically eligible to qualify, but still wanted to have a chance at entering the Nextel All-Star Challenge were made to race in a qualifying race called the Nextel Open, a 30-lap shootout event where the winner of the event would qualify to race in the Nextel All-Star Challenge. Teams who were in the Top 50 in the 2005 NASCAR Nextel Cup Series owner's points standings were allowed to race in the Nextel Open. In addition, a televote was made open to the public where the driver who got the most votes from the public would also qualify to move on to the Nextel All-Star Challenge.

Entry list 

 (R) denotes rookie driver.

Nextel Open

Nextel All-Star Challenge

Practice

Nextel Open 
The only practice for Nextel Open drivers was held on Friday, May 19, at 12:00 PM EST. The session would last for one hour and 30 minutes.

Nextel All-Star Challenge 
The only practice for Nextel All-Star Challenge drivers was held on Friday, May 19, at 1:50 PM EST. The session would last for one hour and 25 minutes.

Qualifying 
Qualifying for the Nextel Open was held on Friday, May 19, at 6:05 PM EST. Each driver would have two laps to set a fastest time; the fastest of the two would count as their official qualifying lap.

Nextel Open

Nextel All-Star Challenge 
Qualifying for the Nextel All-Star Challenge was held on Friday, May 19, at 7:10 PM EST. Each driver would run 3 laps each, with each driver having to do a mandatory pit stop within those three laps.

NASCAR Pit Crew Challenge 
The second iteration of the NASCAR Pit Crew Challenge was held on Wednesday, May 17. Dale Earnhardt, Inc.'s No. 1 team managed to win the event, with the team winning $70,000.

Format and eligibility 
To be eligible to compete, a team either had to win a race in 2005 or 2006, win a previous Nextel All-Star Challenge race, or have won the championship within the last 10 years. The Nextel Open and Fan Vote winners from the 2005 Nextel All-Star Challenge were automatically eligible to enter. 24 teams would compete in a tournament-style bracket with four rounds.

Round 1 
Round 1 would consist of the 24 teams racing against the clock, two teams at a time, in an individual skills/team competition. The teams with the fastest eight overall team times would move on to Round 2.

There were 4 skills that each team had to individually accomplish with their respective members, along with one team exercise at the end:

Front Tire Changer and Front Tire Carrier: The front tire changer and carriers will start from outside the pit box, attacking the right side of the car first, then moving onto the left. The second tire will be pre-positioned by the carrier at the pit wall. Competitors will use their own air guns, and a five second time penalty will be administered for any lugs not properly installed. Tire changer must hit split timer button on exit of pit box.

Rear Tire Changer and Rear Tire Carrier: The rear tire changer and carriers will start from outside the pit box, attacking the right side of the car first, then moving onto the left. The second tire will be pre-positioned by the carrier at the pit wall. Competitors will use their own air guns, and a five second time penalty will be administered for any lugs not properly installed. Tire changer must hit split timer button on exit of pit box.

Gas Man: The gas man and catch can man will be responsible for filling a car with 18 gallons of non-flammable liquid, using two pre-loaded nine gallon cans. Gas men will start with one fuel can in hand from just over the wall near the left rear of the car, and will be timed through setting the second can down. If the fuel cans are not empty, the competitor will receive a time penalty. The gas man must hit the split timer on exit of pit box.

Jack Man: The jack man, using his own jack, must jack each side of the car high enough to lift both tires off the ground. A NASCAR Nextel Cup Series official will signal when the tires on each side of the car are off the ground. The jack man must start from outside of the pit box with his hands off the jack and must set off each light before hitting the split timer button and leaving his pit box.

40 Yard Push: As soon as each team member finishes their respective station, they can go to the center of the Charlotte Coliseum, where a special 40-yard lane is created. Each team will get to push their own 3,200 pound (without driver) race car across the finish line. Timing will begin when the car starts to move, finishing when the nose of the racing machine crosses the electronic finish line.

Round 2 
The eight teams that moved on from Round 1 would go against each other, with seeds being based on overall team time. Round 2 would have each team doing the same challenge as Round 1. The team who won against the other would move on to Round 3.

Round 3 
The four teams that moved on from Round 2 would face off in the semifinals. In this round, the teams would perform a regular four-tire pit stop- whoever won their respective battle would move on to the final.

Round 4 
The two teams that moved on from Round 3 would face off in the final. Similar to Round 3, the teams would perform a regular four-tire pit stop- whoever won the final won the challenge.

Bracket

Nextel Open results

Nextel All-Star Challenge results

References 

2006 NASCAR Nextel Cup Series
NASCAR races at Charlotte Motor Speedway
May 2006 sports events in the United States
2006 in sports in North Carolina